Hannah Krüger (born 4 September 1988) is a German field hockey player. She represented her country at the 2016 Summer Olympics.

References

External links
 
 
 
 

1988 births
Living people
German female field hockey players
Field hockey players at the 2016 Summer Olympics
Olympic field hockey players of Germany
Place of birth missing (living people)
Olympic bronze medalists for Germany
Olympic medalists in field hockey
Medalists at the 2016 Summer Olympics
Sportspeople from Nuremberg
21st-century German women